The thermopause is the atmospheric boundary of Earth's energy system, located at the top of the thermosphere.

Below this, the atmosphere is defined to be active on the insolation received, due to the increased presence of heavier gases such as monatomic oxygen.  The solar constant is thus expressed at the thermopause.  Beyond (above) this, the exosphere describes the thinnest remainder of atmospheric particles with large mean free path, mostly hydrogen and helium. As a lower boundary for the exosphere this boundary is also called the exobase.

A portion of the magnetosphere dips below this layer as well.

Although these are all named layers of the atmosphere, the pressure is so negligible that the chiefly-used definitions of outer space are actually below this altitude.  Orbiting satellites do not experience significant atmospheric heating, but their orbits do decay over time, depending on orbit altitude.  Space missions such as the ISS, Space Shuttle, and Soyuz operate under this boundary.

See also

 Jet stream
 Maximum parcel level

References 

Atmospheric thermodynamics
Atmosphere
Atmospheric boundaries
Atmosphere of Earth